Monika Kaserer (born 11 May 1952) is a former Austrian alpine skier.

World Cup results
8 World Cup race victories at Giant Slalom
2 World Cup victories at Slalom
Giant Slalom World Cup winner 1972/73

Olympics results
1976 Winter Olympics in Innsbruck:
 ninth place at alpine skiing Downhill
 sixth place at alpine skiing Giant Slalom
1972 Winter Olympics in Sapporo:
 seventh at alpine skiing Slalom

World Championships results
Alpine skiing World Championship 1974 in St. Moritz:
 fifth place at Giant Slalom
 fourth place at Downhill
 seventh at Slalom
 Bronze at Combined
Alpine skiing World Championship 1978 in Garmisch-Partenkirchen:
 Bronze at Slalom

References

External links
 
 

1952 births
Living people
Austrian female alpine skiers
Olympic alpine skiers of Austria
Alpine skiers at the 1972 Winter Olympics
Alpine skiers at the 1976 Winter Olympics
FIS Alpine Ski World Cup champions
20th-century Austrian women
21st-century Austrian women